"Without the Communist Party, There Would Be No New China" is a Chinese patriotic song in the People's Republic of China, which originated in 1943 in response to the phrase, "Without the Kuomintang there would be no China".

Background

During World War II when China was fighting the Japanese invasion, Chiang Kai-shek published a book titled  on 10 March 1943, with a slogan that "Without the Kuomintang there would be no China." The Chinese Communist Party published an editorial entitled "Without the Communist Party there would be no China" in the Jiefang Daily on 25 August 1943 to criticize the book, concluding that "If today's China had no Communist Party of China, there would be no new China." In October 1943, a 19-year-old member of the Communist Party of China, created the lyrics for "Without the Communist Party There Would Be No New China", based on this.

In 1950, shortly after the foundation of the People's Republic of China, Mao Zedong changed the title to "Without the Communist Party, There Would Be No New China," by adding the word "new."

The song is included in the 1965 musical The East is Red.

In June 2021, a 587-meter-long musical road playing the song was built on China National Highway 108 near Xiayunling, where the song was written.

See also

 "Ode to the Motherland"
 "Sailing the Seas Depends on the Helmsman"
 "The East Is Red"
 Maoism
 Honglaowai

References

External links
 
 

Mandarin-language songs
Chinese patriotic songs
Maoist China propaganda songs